In 2005 and 2006, STV in Slovakia got its own version of Deal or No Deal, called Ruku na to. It was hosted by Peter Šarkan Novák. The top prize was 5,000,000 korún (about US$225,000, €166,000, or £134,000).

Case values
Here are the case values of this show, as follows:

References

External links
Official website

Deal or No Deal
Slovak reality television series
2005 Slovak television series debuts
2006 Slovak television series endings
2000s Slovak television series
Radio and Television of Slovakia original programming